Five Ten is a German manufacturer of mountain biking, climbing, and trail hiking shoes. Originally an American brand founded in California in 1985 by Charles Cole, Five Ten became one of the top-selling climbing shoe manufacturers worldwide by October 2011.  

In November 2011, Adidas purchased the company for $25 million USD in cash. The company's headquarters are now located at Adidas' headquarters in Herzogenaurach, Germany, as it is now officially a sub-brand of Adidas Outdoor as of April 2020.  Since then, they have created a sustainable apparel line utilizing ocean plastic and recycled polyester.

Sponsorship
Five Ten actively sponsors events and athletes.

Five Ten has a number of professional athletes and teams to focus attention on their products. Five Ten has signed top athletes such as professional rock climbers Shauna Coxsey, Dave Graham, Janja Garnbret, Sasha DiGiulian, Tyler Landman, and Ammon McNeely as well as mountain bikers Sam Hill and Nathan Rennie in addition to top athletes in other sports.

Five Ten also sponsors events related to mountain biking and climbing.

See also 

 List of outdoor industry parent companies

References

External links 
 
 
 

Climbing and mountaineering equipment companies
Shoe companies of the United States